Virgin Lips is a 1928 American silent drama film directed by Elmer Clifton and starring Olive Borden, John Boles and Arline Pretty.

Synopsis
American mining interests in a Central American country hire an American aviator to help defend their investments from local bandits. He in turn receives assistance from an American café dancer who has ended up stranded in the country.

Cast
 Olive Borden as Norma 
 John Boles as Barry Blake 
 Marshall Ruth as Slim 
 Alexander Gill as García 
 Richard Alexander as Carta 
 Erne Veo as Nick 
 Harry Semels as Patron 
 Arline Pretty as Madge 
 William H. Tooker as El Presidente

References

Bibliography
 Munden, Kenneth White. The American Film Institute Catalog of Motion Pictures Produced in the United States, Part 1. University of California Press, 1997.

External links

1928 films
1928 drama films
Silent American drama films
Films directed by Elmer Clifton
American silent feature films
1920s English-language films
American black-and-white films
Columbia Pictures films
Films set in Central America
1920s American films